The Jester Race is the second studio album by Swedish heavy metal band In Flames, released in February 1996. It is the first album to feature Anders Fridén as the band's vocalist, Björn Gelotte as the drummer, and Jester Head as the band's mascot.

The album was the band's second full-length album released following the more mainstream success of their 1995 EP, Subterranean. The Jester Race was recorded at Studio Fredman by Fredrik Nordström, who also contributed keyboards for the album.

The song "Dead Eternity" was originally on the Subterranean (EP) and the song "Dead God in Me" was originally on the Subterranean (EP) but with a different title, "The Inborn Lifeless". Although, the version on The Jester Race has different lyrics, a different ending, and a slightly different solo.

The Jester Race ranked No. 79 on Metal Rules' list of the Top 100 Heavy Metal Albums. It is considered a classic album of the melodic death metal genre, along with At the Gates' Slaughter of the Soul and Dark Tranquillity's The Gallery, exhibiting the dual guitar leads, growled vocals and acoustic sections typical of the genre.

A remixed version of the song "Moonshield" was released on the EP Trigger. A video for the song "Artifacts of the Black Rain" was also released.

Trivium frontman Matthew K. Heafy revealed in an interview with Wall of Sound that The Jester Race is "the one metal album you should have heard by now."

Track listing

Personnel

In Flames
Anders Fridén − lead vocals
Jesper Strömblad −  rhythm guitar, acoustic guitar, keyboards
Glenn Ljungström − lead guitar
Johan Larsson − bass, backing vocals
Björn Gelotte − drums, additional guitars

Guest appearances
Fredrik Nordström − keyboards
Oscar Dronjak − vocal appearance on "Dead Eternity"
Fredrik Johansson − lead guitar on "December Flower"
Kaspar Dahlqvist − keyboards on "Wayfaerer"

Production and composition
Produced by Fredrik Nordström and In Flames
Lyrical concept and song titles collaborated by Niklas Sundin and Anders Fridén
Lyrics on "Dead Eternity" by Jocke Göthberg
Engineered by Fredrik Nordström and Patrik Hellgren
Mastered by Staffan Olofsson
Logo by Glenn Ljungström
Artwork by Andreas Marschall
Photos by Kenneth Johansson
Layout by M&A Music art

References

External links
The Jester Race album details
The Jester Race information
Official lyrics (every track)

In Flames albums
1996 albums
Nuclear Blast albums
Albums produced by Fredrik Nordström